Christian Kist (born 21 April 1986) is a Dutch professional darts player. In 2012, he won the BDO World Darts Championship, defeating Tony O'Shea in the final. Since 2014, he has competed in the Professional Darts Corporation (PDC).

Career

BDO
Kist reached the last 16 of the 2011 World Masters, where he lost 2-3 against Tony West in a deciding leg having had five darts to win. After that performance he was awarded a wild-card for the Zuiderduin Masters. 

Kist qualified for the 2012 BDO World Championship via the International Playoffs. Kist defeated compatriot Jan Dekker 3-2 in the first round. He then defeated Belgium's Geert De Vos in the second round by a scoreline of 4-2. Kist followed this with a 5-1 quarter-final victory over good friend Alan Norris. Kist then recovered from 5-3 down in the semi-final against two-time champion Ted Hankey, who had one dart at bullseye to win the match 6-5, to reach the final. He played popular crowd favourite Tony O'Shea, who was making his second Lakeside final. Kist went into the break 4-2 up, and later went 6-2 ahead, but O'Shea mounted a comeback taking the next three sets. However, Kist held his nerve to record a 7-5 win and became the BDO World Champion, the first Dutchman and first qualifier to lift the title since Jelle Klaasen in 2006.

Kist was knocked out in the first round against Robbie Green at the 2013 BDO World Championship. After losing in the first round to James Wilson at the 2014 Championship, Kist announced he would be switching to the Professional Darts Corporation by entering their Qualifying School. 
Kist played in the 2022 World Masters, reaching the last 32 stage.

PDC

Kist lost 5–2 to Matt Padgett in the final round of the third day, but finished in the top 24 on the Q School Order of Merit to seal a two-year PDC tour card. His first quarter-final came a month later at the fourth UK Open Qualifier where he lost 6–1 to Jamie Lewis. At the UK Open he saw off Antonio Alcinas 9–2 and survived as Vincent van der Voort missed match darts in three successive legs in the next round to win 9–8. In the fifth round, Kist was beaten 9–6 by Mervyn King. At the third Players Championship, Kist beat James Wade 6–3 to reach his first semi-final on the PDC tour where he missed four match darts against Gary Anderson and went on to lose 6–5. He let 3–1 and 5–3 leads slip in the first round of the European Championship against Mervyn King to lose 6–5. At the Grand Slam he enjoyed 5–2 and 5–1 wins over Andy Hamilton and Richie George to finish second in his group behind Phil Taylor. In the last 16, Kist started well to be 3–0 ahead of Michael Smith, but went on to be eliminated 10–5. Kist was the final qualifier for the Players Championship Finals and missed one dart at the bull to beat Anderson, instead being defeated 6–5 with an average of 100.40 to Anderson's 110.62.

Kist made his debut in the 2015 PDC World Championship after qualifying through the Pro Tour Order of Merit and was knocked out 3–1 in sets by compatriot and fellow former BDO world champion Jelle Klaasen in the first round. After his first year in the PDC he was ranked world number 45. After trailing Ian White 6–0 in the third round of the UK Open, Kist responded to send the match into a deciding leg but lost it to be eliminated 9–8. He lost in the quarter-finals of the second Players Championship 6–4 to Andrew Gilding and went a stage further at the seventh event by knocking out world number one Michael van Gerwen 6–4, but was then beaten 6–1 by Peter Wright in the semis. Kist lost 6–4 in the first round of the European Championship to Rowby-John Rodriguez.

Kist qualified for the 2016 World Championship and punished a poor performance from Justin Pipe to eliminate him 3–0, before losing 4–1 to Dave Chisnall in the second round. He could not win enough matches to qualify for the UK Open, but reached his first quarter-final of the year at the seventh Players Championship event and was beaten 6–1 by Peter Wright. At the 17th event he overcame Gary Anderson, Prakash Jiwa, Kyle Anderson, Dave Chisnall, Justin Pipe and Mensur Suljović to play in his first PDC final, where he lost 6–1 to Michael van Gerwen. 6–4 and 6–2 victories over Ricky Evans and Dimitri Van den Bergh progressed Kist through to the third round of the Players Championship Finals. He then beat Pipe 10–6 to reach his first quarter-final major since joining the PDC and was 8–3 down to Darren Webster, before cutting it back to 8–6, but lost 10–6.

In the first round of the 2017 World Championship, Kist lost six of the final seven legs to be defeated 3–1 by Brendan Dolan.

Kist lost his Tour Card at the end of the 2019 season.

Nickname
Kist's nickname of "The Lipstick" was suggested by Bobby George for three reasons: the name "Kist" sounding like "kissed", the fact that the treble 20 is referred to by players as "the lipstick" as it is coloured red, and the fact that Kist has an unusual habit of opening his mouth during every throw similar to fellow professional players Colin Monk and Shayne Burgess.

Personal life
Kist was a road worker by trade before becoming a professional darts player.

World Championship results

BDO
 2012: Winner (beat Tony O'Shea 7–5)
 2013: First round (lost to Robbie Green 1–3)
 2014: First round (lost to James Wilson 1–3)

PDC
 2015: First round (lost to Jelle Klaasen 1–3)
 2016: Second round (lost to Dave Chisnall 1–4)
 2017: First round (lost to Brendan Dolan 1–3)
 2018: First round (lost to Michael van Gerwen 1–3)

Career finals

BDO major finals: 1 (1 title)

WDF major finals: 1 (1 runner-up)

Performance timeline

References

External links

1986 births
Living people
Dutch darts players
People from Vroomshoop
BDO world darts champions
Professional Darts Corporation former tour card holders
Sportspeople from Overijssel
21st-century Dutch people